The 2015 World Indoor Lacrosse Championship (WILC) was the fourth international box lacrosse championship organized by the Federation of International Lacrosse every four years. The 2015 WILC was hosted by the Onondaga Nation, south of Syracuse, New York, and took place between September 18 and 27. Canada defeated the host Iroquois Nationals 12–8 in the gold medal game, the same finals match-up featured in the first three indoor championships. Since the WILC started in 2003, Team Canada is undefeated with an overall record of 23–0.

In the bronze medal game, the United States beat first-time participant Israel 15–4. Canadian Shawn Evans was the tournament MVP, scoring 10 goals and 25 assists in 5 games.

Thirteen countries participated, 5 more than in 2011, including first-time competitors Finland, Germany, Israel, Serbia, Switzerland, and Turkey. Most games were held on the Onondaga Nation at the Onondaga Nation Arena and the newly built $6.5 million Onondaga Nation Fieldhouse, although the Iroquois' games versus Canada and the United States were held at War Memorial Arena in Syracuse. Over 10,000 fans attended the gold and bronze medal games in the Carrier Dome.

The opening ceremonies in the sold-out War Memorial Arena featured a light show about the Haudenosaunee creation story and traditional dancing. After the Iroquois Nationals were not allowed to use their Haudenosaunee passports to travel to England in 2010 due to new security requirements, many international players were interested in getting their passports stamped by the Onondaga Nation. The documentary Spirit Game: Pride of a Nation explains the meaning of lacrosse to the Iroquois people and covers the Iroquois Nationals in the 2015 WILC, featuring brothers Lyle and Miles Thompson.

Venues

Pool play 
The teams were divided into 3 divisions, with the 5 highest-ranked teams placed in the Blue Division and the others being split into the Red and Green Divisions. In the Blue Division, the top two teams advanced to the semifinals, the third and fourth teams entered the quarterfinals and the fifth team was placed in the classification bracket. The top two teams in both the Red and Green Divisions entered the play-in games, while the bottom two teams were placed in the classification bracket.

Blue Division
Canada once again was undefeated in pool play, although the game versus the Iroquois was hard-fought. The Nationals led 8–4 early in the third period, but Canada outscored them 7–1 the rest of the game.

Red Division

Green Division

Play-in games 

Israel was seeded #5 and Ireland #6 in the quarterfinals. Finland and Australia were placed in the classification bracket.

Championship bracket
The gold medal game was close throughout the first half, with only two brief two-goal leads for Canada. Canada led 6–5 at the half, then the teams traded two-goal runs to get back to 8–7 in the early fourth quarter.  Steven Priolo and Stephan Leblanc both scored in unsettled situations within a minute of each other for Canada to take command of the game with 10 minutes left.

Team Canada's Curtis Dickson led all scorers with four goals, including one open-net goal, and an assist. His teammate Mark Matthews had four assists. Randy Staats and Johnny Powless both had four points for the Iroquois.

Classification bracket

Ranking, leaders, and awards

Final ranking

Scoring leaders

Goaltending leaders

All World Team 
Forwards
 Lyle Thompson
 Mark Matthews
Transition
 Jeff Shattler
Defense
 Sid Smith
 Chris Corbell
Goaltender
 Matt Vinc
Most Valuable Player
 Shawn Evans

Source:

References

External links 

Stats: World Indoor Lacrosse Championship 2015 at Point Bench
2015 WILC stories at Syracuse.com
WILC 2015 Best Moments at Indian Country Today
Videos, highlights and interviews from WILC at IWGA

Lacrosse of the Iroquois Confederacy
Lacrosse in Syracuse, New York
World Indoor Lacrosse Championship
World Indoor Lacrosse Championship
World Indoor Lacrosse Championship
Events in Syracuse, New York